The 1938 Florida A&M Rattlers football team was an American football team that represented Florida A&M College as a member of the Southern Intercollegiate Athletic Conference (SIAC) during the 1938 college football season. In their third season under head coach William "Big Bill" Bell, the Rattlers compiled a perfect 8–0 record, defeated  in the Orange Blossom Classic, outscored opponents by a total of 189 to 7, and were recognized as the black college national championship. The Rattlers played their home games at College Field in Tallahassee, Florida.

The team gained acclaim for not allowing a single point by opponents during the regular season.  In seven regular season games, the Rattlers outscored opponents by a total of 180 to 0. Hailing the team as the pride of Florida, one sports writer observed: "The brand of football these colored lads have been turning out is so good that 'white folks' have been flocking to their games this year throughout the south." 

The team's acclaimed backfield, made up of quarterback Henry Butler, fullback Stanley Strachan, and halfbacks John D. Harris and Tom "Tank" Jones, was known as the "Four Ghosts". 

The line, known as the "Seven Rocks", did not allow a first down against . Defensively, the team still holds school records for both fewest yards allowed (951 yards in eight games) and fewest first downs allowed (53 in eight games).

Jake Gaither, who later led the Rattlers from 1945 to 1969, was an assistant coach for the 1938 team.

Schedule

References

Florida AandM
Florida A&M Rattlers football seasons
College football undefeated seasons
Florida AandM Rattlers football
Black college football national champions